Udea confinalis is a species of moth in the family Crambidae. It is found in Greece and Syria.

References

Moths described in 1858
confinalis
Moths of Europe